The 2021–22 WBBL season will be the 8th season of the Women's British Basketball League, the top British women's professional basketball league, since its establishment in 2014. The season featured 13 teams from across England, Scotland and Wales.

Teams

WBBL Championship
Each team will play each other once home and once away for a 24-game regular season. The top 8 teams will qualify for the post-season playoffs.

Standings

WBBL Playoffs
Quarter-finals

Semi-finals

Final

WBBL Cup
The 2021-22 WBBL Cup featured all 13 teams, split into four geographical groups. Each group was played at a central venue hosted by one of the teams in the group. The winner of each group would advance to the semi-finals.

Qualification Stage

Group A

Group B

Group C

Group D

Semi-finals

Final

WBBL Trophy
The 2021-22 WBBL Trophy was a straight knockout competition featuring all thirteen clubs. The top 3 teams from the 2020-21 WBBL Championship (Sevenoaks Suns, Leicester Riders and London Lions) received a bye to the quarter-finals. The remaining teams were seeded based on their finishing positions in the 2020-21 WBBL Championship.

First round

Quarter-finals

Semi-finals

Final

References

External links

Seasons in British basketball leagues
2021–22 in European women's basketball leagues
2022 in British women's sport
2021 in British women's sport